Samuel Foote (1720–1777) was a British dramatist, actor and theatre manager from Cornwall.

Samuel Foote (or Foot) may refer to:
 Samuel J. Foote (1873–1936), lawyer and political figure in Newfoundland
Samuel A. Foot (1780–1846), politician from Connecticut
Samuel Foote (writer), founder of the Semi-Colon Club in Cincinnati, Ohio